Kaiwá is a Guarani language spoken by about 18,000 Kaiwá people in Brazil in the state of Mato Grosso do Sul and 510 people in northeastern Argentina. Literacy is 5-10% in Kaiwá and 15–25% in Portuguese. Kaiwá proper is 70% lexically similar with the Pai Tavytera language, and its similarity to its linguistic cousin Guaraní, one of the two national-languages of Paraguay alongside the Spanish language, means it is even sometimes considered mutually intelligible.

Phonology

Vowels 

Consonants 

 Prenasalized stops can also be heard as nasal sonorants.
[w] is heard as an allophone of /v/ or /u/.
[j] is heard as an allophone of /i/.

Sample text

Eregwata-ramo ka'agwy-rupi erehexa gwa'a. Hagwe pytã porã. Oveve áry-rupi gwa'a. Oveve-ramo, "Kaa! Kaa!" he'i. Heta oĩ gwa'a ka'agwy-rupi.

Portuguese translation:

Quando você passeia no mato, você vê  arara. A plumagem dela é dum vermelho bonito.  arara voa no céu. Quando voa, grita "Kaa! Kaa!" Há muitas araras no mato.

Rough English translation:

When you walk in the bush, you see the macaw. The plumage is a beautiful red. The macaw flies in the sky. When it flies, it shouts "Kaa! Kaa!" There are many macaws in the bush.

Notes

Bibliography
 Summer Institute of Linguistics (1980) Te'ýi nhe'ẽ. 5 Cartilha Kaiwá, SIL, Brasilia, DF.

Languages of Brazil
Languages of Argentina
Tupi–Guarani languages